Hugo Boisvert is a Canadian ice hockey coach and retired center who was a two-time All-American for Ohio State.

Career
Boisvert was the star player for his junior team, the Cornwall Colts. He led the club in scoring twice, averaging more than two points per games both times. He helped the team win back-to-back league championships. Boisvert began attending Ohio State University in 1996 and immediately began to produce offensively. He finished his freshman season at a point per game pace and was named to the conference Rookie Team. The following year, Boisvert led the team in scoring and was named an All-American but the team performed even better. Ohio State reached the CCHA championship game for the first time in 26 years and received their first bid to the NCAA Tournament. The Buckeyes won their first two tournament games and reached the Frozen Four. Boisvert's numbers declined slightly as a junior but he still led the team in scoring by 14 points. He led the team back to the NCAA Tournament but this time they fell in their opening game.

Boisvert left Ohio State after his junior season and played on the Canadian national team for a year. Afterwards, he began his professional career with a rather unimpressive season for the Orlando Solar Bears in the final year of the IHL. He picked up his scoring in the postseason and was able to earn a job with the Grand Rapids Griffins, playing three seasons for the club. In 2004, Boisvert travelled to Europe and began playing in Germany.

In his first year with the Füchse Duisburg, Boisvert rediscovered his scoring touch and helped the team win promotion to the DEL. After helping them stave off relegation the following year, he signed on with the Kassel Huskies, whom had been relegated that year, and performed well for the team. He was named team captain in 2007 and led them to a league championship, securing promotion back to the top level of German ice hockey. Boisvert remained with the club for two more years before moving down to another Bundesliga team, Dresdner Eislöwen. By this time, Boisvert's scoring was declining and though he still played well, he was unable to get a third team promoted to the DEL. He stayed with the club for 5 years before retiring as a player in 2015. 

The next season, Boisvert returned to the Huskies as an assistant coach. After three years, he was named the had coach for the Bietigheim Steelers. After finishing as runners-up in the regular season in 2019, the club declined and Boisvert was let go in November the following year. After sitting out the 20-21 season, Boisvert was back behind the bench as an assistant with Rote Teufel Bad Nauheim in 2021.

Boisvert was inducted into the Ohio State Athletic Hall of Fame in 2013.

Personal
Hugo's son Zavier, born 2006, plays junior ice hockey in Germany.

Statistics

Regular season and playoffs

Awards and honors

References

External links

1976 births
Living people
AHCA Division I men's ice hockey All-Americans
Canadian ice hockey centres
Ice hockey people from Quebec
People from Saint-Eustache, Quebec
Ohio State Buckeyes men's ice hockey players
Orlando Solar Bears (IHL) players
Grand Rapids Griffins players
Füchse Duisburg players
Kassel Huskies players
Dresdner Eislöwen players
Canadian expatriate ice hockey people
Canadian expatriate ice hockey players in the United States
Canadian expatriate ice hockey players in Germany
Canadian ice hockey coaches
Naturalized citizens of Germany